/Ladbrokes Trophy

|}

The Coral Gold Cup is a Premier Handicap National Hunt steeplechase in Great Britain which is open to horses aged four years or older. It is run at Newbury over a distance of about 3 miles and 2 furlongs (3 miles, 1 furlong and 214 yards, or 5,225 metres), and during its running there are twenty-one fences to be jumped. It is a handicap race, and it is scheduled to take place each year in late November or early December.

History
The event was established in 1957 as the Hennessy Cognac Gold Cup, and it was initially staged at Cheltenham. The winner of the inaugural running, Mandarin, was owned by Peggy Hennessy, a member of the family which founded Hennessy, the race's sponsoring company. It was transferred to Newbury in 1960, and it was won by Mandarin for a second time in 1961. The race's second running was won by Taxidermist, ridden by the amateur rider John Lawrence, later Lord Oaksey, who was the breeder and part-owner of the 2011 winner, Carruthers.

The race's association with Hennessy continued until the 60th running, in 2016, and was British racing's longest-running commercial sponsorship at the time. The record was previously held by the Whitbread Gold Cup, which was first run seven months before the "Hennessy", and which was sponsored by Whitbread until 2001. Ladbrokes were announced as the new sponsor in February 2017 and the race was run as the Ladbrokes Trophy until 2021. In 2022 Coral replaced Ladbrokes as the title sponsor and the race took its present title.

The race has been won by nine horses that have also won the Cheltenham Gold Cup. The most recent of these is Native River, the winner of the latter race in 2018.

Many Clouds became the first horse to win both the Hennessy Gold Cup and the Grand National, in 2014 and 2015 respectively.

Records
Most successful horse (2 wins):
 Mandarin – 1957, 1961
 Arkle – 1964, 1965
 Denman – 2007, 2009

Leading jockey (3 wins):
 Willie Robinson – Mandarin (1961), Mill House (1963), Man of the West (1968)
 Tom Scudamore - Madison du Berlais (2008), Sizing Tennessee (2018), Cloth Cap (2020)

Leading trainer (7 wins):
 Fulke Walwyn – Mandarin (1957, 1961), Taxidermist (1958), Mill House (1963), Man of the West (1968), Charlie Potheen (1972), Diamond Edge (1981)

Winners
 Weights given in stones and pounds

See also
 Horse racing in Great Britain
 List of British National Hunt races

References

 Evening Times:
 Racing Post:
 pedigreequery.com – Hennessy Gold Cup – Newbury.
 sportingchronicle.com – Hennessy Cognac Gold Cup.

External links
 Race Recordings 

National Hunt races in Great Britain
Newbury Racecourse
National Hunt chases
Recurring sporting events established in 1957
1957 establishments in England